Kelvin is a surname. Notable people with this surname include:
 Arthur Kelvin (born 1869), Scottish footballer 
 Ray Kelvin (born 1955), British businessman
 Rob Kelvin (born 1944), Australian newsman
 Kris Kelvin, a fictional character, the protagonist of the novel Solaris by Stanislaw Lem and in three films based on the novel

See also
Lord Kelvin (William Thomson, 1st Baron Kelvin, 1824–1907), British engineer and physicist, the namesake of the kelvin temperature unit 
Kelvin (given name)